Nalla Narasimha Reddy Education Society's Group of Institutions, Hyderabad (NNRG Hyderabad) is a autonomous college, focusing on engineering,pharmacy and management studies located in Hyderabad, India.

History
Founded in 2009 by Nalla Narasimha Reddy, the organization has the primary objective of educating young people to prepare them for national and international requirements, to fund the needy and to promote research in science and technology. An "Integrated Contiguous Campus" with multi-disciplinary Technical, Engineering, Pharmacy and Management programs under the banner of Nalla Narasimha Reddy Education Society's (NNRES) Group of Institutions has been created.

The college is situated at Narapally. It can accommodate about 600 students.

Academics
An institution with academic and research-oriented courses, the B.Tech. programs (undergraduate programs) number about 6. Major branches among them are Computer Science and Engineering, Information Technology, Electronics and Communication, Electrical and Electronics, Mechanical, and Civil. The postgraduate programs namely M.Tech., MBA, MPharm and MCA.

Departments
 Electronics and Communication Engineering
 Electrical and Electronics Engineering
 Civil Engineering
 Computer Science & Engineering
Information Technology
 Mechanical Engineering
 Pharmacy
Masters of Business Administration

See also 
Education in India
Literacy in India
List of institutions of higher education in Telangana

References

NNRES
Careers 360

External links
NNRES Hyderabad website

Universities and colleges in Hyderabad, India
2009 establishments in Andhra Pradesh
Educational institutions established in 2009